In physics, the thermal conductance quantum  describes the rate at which heat is transported through a single ballistic phonon channel with temperature . 

It is given by

.

The thermal conductance of any electrically insulating structure that exhibits ballistic phonon transport is a positive integer multiple of  The thermal conductance quantum was first measured in 2000. These measurements employed suspended silicon nitride nanostructures that exhibited a constant thermal conductance of 16  at temperatures below approximately 0.6 kelvin.

Relation to the quantum of electrical conductance 
For ballistic electrical conductors, the electron contribution to the thermal conductance is also quantized as a result of the electrical conductance quantum and the Wiedemann–Franz law, which has been quantitatively measured at both cryogenic (~20 mK)  and room temperature (~300K).

The thermal conductance quantum, also called quantized thermal conductance, may be understood from the Wiedemann-Franz law, which shows that

where  is a universal constant called the Lorenz factor,

In the regime with quantized electric conductance, one may have

where  is an integer, also known as TKNN number. Then

where  is the thermal conductance quantum defined above.

References

See also
 Thermal properties of nanostructures

Mesoscopic physics
Nanotechnology
Quantum mechanics
Condensed matter physics
Physical quantities
Heat conduction